Londis is a symbol group in the United Kingdom with over 2,000 stores nationwide. Tesco owns the brand, following its 2018 purchase of Booker Group.

Although it was formerly a subsidiary, the Londis brand in Ireland is no longer related to Londis (UK).

Etymology
The name Londis is a contraction of "London District Stores".

History

Foundation

Londis was established in Great Britain in 1959 by Kevin Stanley Adams as a communally owned company, with each retailer owning a share in the parent company.

Acquisition by Musgrave Group
However, in June 2004, the parent company was sold to the Irish Musgrave wholesale chain with a payment of £31,000 being made to each retailer who owned a stake, bringing it under the same ownership as Budgens, which has now adopted a similar franchise based business model.
This acquisition proved controversial, with the CEO of Musgrave in the United Kingdom, Eoin McGettigan, steering through the choppy waters of member revolts and counter offers from others backed by Icelandic banks. A separate, but wholly owned subsidiary company, Musgrave Retail Partners GB Ltd. was formed to supply the stores, until it was sold to Booker Group in 2015.In May 2015, Londis' parent company Musgrave Group confirmed it had reached an agreement to sell Budgens and Londis for £40 million to the wholesaler Booker Group, subject to regulatory approval.

Acquistion by Booker Group
Since May 2015, the company has been owned by Booker Group, which purchased Londis and its sister company Budgens from the Musgrave Group for £40 million.

Tesco plc acquired Booker Group in 2018.

Operations
The current Londis retailer network is in excess of 2,200 stores and forecourt shops located throughout England, Scotland and Wales. There is a Londis at every Butlins, Pontins and Haven Holidays camp.

References

External links

Londis UK website

Tesco
1959 establishments in the United Kingdom
Convenience stores of the United Kingdom
Demutualized organizations
Former co-operatives of the United Kingdom
British companies established in 1959
Retail companies established in 1959
Retailers' cooperatives
British brands
Supermarkets of the United Kingdom
Retail companies of the United Kingdom